The Laval Rouge et Or football team represents Laval University in Quebec City in the sport of Canadian football in U Sports. The program began its first regular season in 1996 and has quickly become one of the most successful programs in Canadian university football history. The Rouge et Or have won a record 11 Vanier Cup championships and their most recent victory occurred at the 57th Vanier Cup in 2022. They are also the only program to have played in four straight Vanier Cups and have a record of 11–2 in Vanier Cup games. The Rouge et Or have also won the Dunsmore Cup 16 times since 1999, demonstrating their historical dominance in their conference.

History
The Rouge et Or football program was first conceived of by Mike Labadie, a local physical education teacher, and Jacques Tanguay, a wealthy alumnus and avid sports fan. They had noted an exodus of French-speaking football players to English speaking schools because there was no Francophone option for them to continue their football careers. Tanguay invested heavily into the football program as the Rouge et Or began their first season in 1996, one year after the National Hockey League's Quebec Nordiques had left Quebec City to relocate to Colorado. Labadie was the team's first head coach and they finished the year with a 1–7 record. The following year, Jacques Chapdelaine was hired to become the team's head coach. The Rouge et Or were the first Canadian collegiate team to feature full-time, paid assistant coaches and the first to use video editing, further giving them a heightened competitive advantage.

Laval won their first national championship in 1999, against the Saint Mary's Huskies, under head coach Chapdelaine, bringing the Vanier Cup back to Quebec for the first time since 1987. Chapdelaine left the program following the 2000 season to continue his coaching career in the Canadian Football League. In 2001, current head coach Glen Constantin was promoted from his defensive coordinator position and led the team to 5–3 record and another Dunsmore Cup. However, during that season, the program had to vacate all victories due to use of an ineligible player. Consequently, that season is recorded as having eight regular season losses and three playoff losses.

For the following season in 2002, the Rouge et Or finished 6-2 and lost to the Concordia Stingers in the QUFL semi-final. This is notable because, as of 2017, it is the last time that the Rouge et Or have had more than one regular season loss and the last time the program failed to qualify for the Dunsmore Cup. The following season, the Rouge et Or began their conference dominance, scoring a school record 481 points in eight regular season games (over 60 points on average per game), en route to their second Dunsmore Cup. The Rouge et Or finished that season with their second Vanier Cup victory, also against Saint Mary's, in the 39th Vanier Cup which was Constantin's first as head coach.

In 2004, the Rouge et Or repeated as Vanier Cup champions for the first time in school history by defeating the Saskatchewan Huskies in the 40th Vanier Cup. Laval became the fourth program in Canadian collegiate history to repeat as Vanier Cup champions. It was the lowest scoring game in Vanier Cup history as Laval won by a score of 7-1 and it was the first Vanier Cup held outside of Toronto as the game was played at Ivor Wynne Stadium in Hamilton, Ontario.

In 2005, the Saskatchewan Huskies collected a measure of revenge as they defeated the Rouge et Or in the semi-final Mitchell Bowl in Saskatoon. However, in the following year, the two teams met again in the 2006 Vanier Cup, where the Vanier Cup was being played in Saskatoon for the first time and in the Huskies home stadium, Griffiths Stadium. The team claimed the rubber match by defeating the Saskatchewan Huskies 13–8, in a game played in temperatures below −20 °C. Linebacker Éric Maranda, that game's MVP, was chosen to play in the U.S. East–West Shrine Game in Houston, Texas on January 19, 2008.

For the 2007 season, the Rouge et Or claimed their fifth straight Dunsmore Cup championship, but lost to the Saint Mary's Huskies in the Uteck Bowl in Huskies Stadium in Halifax. It marked the last time, as of 2017, that Laval had lost to a team from the Atlantic University Sport conference. The following year, Laval, ranked first in Canada, played in the 2008 Vanier Cup, and defeated the third-ranked Western Mustangs 44–21 to claim their fifth national championship. It was the eighth time that Laval had finished their season paying in a national final or semi-final and, oddly, the first of those occurrences where the opposing team was not nicknamed the "Huskies." The 2008 season also saw the program produce its first Hec Crighton Trophy winner as Benoit Groulx was named the CIS football's most valuable player.

Laval University hosted the Vanier Cup game for the first time in 2009, but the Rouge et Or lost to the eventual champion Queen's Golden Gaels in the Mitchell Bowl played at Richardson Memorial Stadium in Kingston, Ontario. However, Laval was hosting back-to-back Vanier Cup games and the Rouge et Or qualified for the 46th Vanier Cup in 2010. There, the Rouge et Or dominated the Calgary Dinos 29–2 to win their sixth Vanier Cup championship. They were the first team in CIS history to win 13 straight games in 13 weeks of play after they played nine regular season games in 2010 (The QUFL extended the regular season to nine games in 2010). Their defence also set a Vanier Cup record for fewest yards allowed, 140, beating the previous record of 161 allowed by the Guelph Gryphons in 1984. Laval won in front of 16,237 hometown fans, becoming the second program to win the Vanier Cup at home, with the Toronto Varsity Blues winning in 1965 and 1993.

In the following season, Laval lost a Vanier Cup game for the first time in program history, as they fell 41-38 to the McMaster Marauders in double overtime in the 2011 Vanier Cup. This game was played at BC Place and was the first Vanier Cup to be played in Vancouver. The Rouge et Or would exact a measure of revenge the following year in a rematch against the Marauders in the 48th Vanier Cup. The team won a Canadian collegiate record seventh Vanier Cup championship in front of an also record crowd of 37,098 fans at the Rogers Centre in Toronto by a score of 37–14. In 2013, they won back-to-back national championships for the second time in program history when they defeated the Calgary Dinos in the 49th Vanier Cup by a score of 25–14. The game was again played at Telus Stadium on the campus of Laval University in front of 18,543 fans.

The 2014 season saw the full rise of the Montreal Carabins to prominence, as they not only defeated the Rouge et Or in the regular season, but they also defeated them in the post-season and at home in the Dunsmore Cup. It snapped Laval's 70-game home winning streak (combined regular season and post-season) and 11-year Dunsmore Cup winning streak. Proving that 2014 was no fluke, the Carabins again defeated the Rouge et Or the following year in Quebec City in the Dunsmore Cup and would again represent the RSEQ in the Vanier Cup.

In 2016, the Rouge et Or finished in second place in the RSEQ after losing the head-to-head tie-breaker to the Carabins. Nonetheless, they defeated those Carabins in Montreal in the Dunsmore Cup and advanced to their tenth Vanier Cup appearance in the 52nd Vanier Cup. In that game, the Rouge et Or came back on top by squeezing a narrow 31–26 victory against the Calgary Dinos in Hamilton at Tim Hortons Field. The Rouge et Or qualified for the 53rd Vanier Cup the following year, but were soundly defeated by the Western Mustangs by a score of 39–17. It was their most lopsided loss since they were defeated by the Saint Mary's Huskies by a similar 22-point margin in their 24–2 loss in the 2007 Uteck Bowl. In 2018, the Rouge et Or would exact a measure of revenge by returning to the national championship game and defeating the Mustangs by a score of 34–20 in front of a home crowd in the 54th Vanier Cup. The win capped the fourth undefeated season in program history.

On October 20, 2019, a record 19,381 fans attended the Rouge et Or game against the Montreal Carabins as the program celebrated their 25th anniversary. The team finished in first place in 2019, but were defeated by the Carabins at home in the Dunsmore Cup, ending their three-year Vanier Cup appearance streak.

Season-by-season record

Notes

Head coaches

National award winners
Hec Crighton Trophy: Benoit Groulx (2008), Kevin Mital (2022)
J. P. Metras Trophy: Carl Gourgues (2001), Dominic Picard (2005), Étienne Légaré (2008), Arnaud Gascon-Nadon (2010, 2011), Mathieu Betts (2016, 2017, 2018)
Presidents' Trophy: Frédéric Plesius (2012), Adam Auclair (2017)
Peter Gorman Trophy: Jean-Frédéric Tremblay (2000), Hugo Richard (2014), Mathieu Betts (2015)
Russ Jackson Award: Josh Alexander (2001), Dillon Heap (2011)
Lieutenant Governor Athletic Award: Mathieu Betts (2019)
Frank Tindall Trophy: Glen Constantin (2005, 2010)

Former players playing professionally

Laval Rouge et Or in the CFL

As of the end of the 2022 CFL season, 15 former Rouge et Or players are on CFL teams' rosters:
Adam Auclair, Ottawa Redblacks
Dan Basambombo, Ottawa Redblacks
Boris Bede, Toronto Argonauts
Mathieu Betts, BC Lions
Pierre-Luc Caron, Montreal Alouettes
David Côté, Montreal Alouettes
Vincent Desjardins, Montreal Alouettes
Marco Dubois, Ottawa Redblacks
Vincent Forbes-Mombleau, Edmonton Elks
Philippe Gagnon, Montreal Alouettes
Felix Garand-Gauthier, Hamilton Tiger-Cats
Shayne Gauthier, Winnipeg Blue Bombers
Cyrille Hogan-Saindon, Ottawa Redblacks
Edris Jean-Alphonse, Ottawa Redblacks
Souleymane Karamoko, Winnipeg Blue Bombers

Laval Rouge et Or in the NFL
As of week 9 of the 2022 NFL season, one former Rouge et Or player is on an NFL team's roster:
Antony Auclair, Tennessee Titans

References

External links 
 
 Sport's history at Laval University

 
Université Laval
Sports teams in Quebec City
U Sports football teams